Ualikhanov is a district of North Kazakhstan Region in northern Kazakhstan. The administrative center of the district is the selo of Kishkenekol. Population:

Geography
Lakes Siletiteniz and Teke are located in the eastern part of the district.

References

Districts of Kazakhstan
North Kazakhstan Region